Inostrancevia is an extinct genus of large carnivorous therapsids who lived during the Late Permian in what is now European Russia. The first known fossils of this gorgonopsian were discovered in Northern Dvina, where two almost complete skeletons was exhumed. Subsequently, several other fossil material was discovered in various oblasts, and these finds will lead to a confusion about the exact number of valid species, before only three of them where officially recognized : I. alexandri, I. latifrons and I. uralensis. The genus is named in honor of Alexander Inostrantsev, professor of Vladimir P. Amalitsky, the paleontologist who described the taxon.

The animal is characterized by its robust skeleton, his broad skull and a very advanced dentition, possessing large canines, the longest of which can reach  and probably used to shear the skin of preys. Like most other gorgonopsians, Inostrancevia had a particularly large jaw opening angle, which would have allowed to deliver fatal bites. These features make it one of the most specialized apex predators tetrapods of the Paleozoic.

First regularly classified as close to African taxa such as Gorgonops or rubidgeines, phylogenetic analyzes published since 2018 consider it to belong to a group of derived Russian gorgonopsians, now being classified alongside the genera Suchogorgon, Sauroctonus and Pravoslavlevia. According to the fossil record, the fauna where Inostrancevia lived was a cold desert with a fluvial ecosystem containing many tetrapods, where it turns out to have been the main predator.

Research history

Recognized species 
During the 1890s, Russian paleontologist Vladimir Amalitsky discovered freshwater sediments dating from the Upper Permian in Northern Dvina, Arkhangelsk Oblast, northern European Russia. The locality consists of a creek with sandstone and lens-shaped exposures in a bank escarpment, containing many particularly well-preserved fossil skeletons. This type of fauna from this period, previously known only from South Africa and India, is considered as one of the greatest paleontological discoveries of the late 19th and early 20th centuries. After the preliminary reconnaissance of the place, Amalitsky conducts systematic research with his companion Anna Petrovna. The exhumations of the fossils then lasted until 1914, when the research stopped due to the start of the World War I. The fossils discovered within the site will subsequently be moved to the Museum of Geology and Mineralogy of the Russian Academy of Sciences. All the fossils listed were not prepared, and more than 100 tons of concretions were promised for new discoveries by the museum in question.

The multiple administrative activities and difficult conditions during Amalitsky's last years have severely hampered his fossil research, leading to his unexpected death in 1917. However, among all the fossils identified before his death are two remarkably complete skeletons of large gorgonopsians, cataloged PIN 1758 and PIN 2005/1578 (the latter of which would later be recognized as the lectotype of the genus). After identification, he assigned the two specimens to a new genus and species, which he named Inostranzevia alexandri. Although he did not provide the etymology of the term in his descriptions, the full name of the taxon is named in honor of the renowned geologist Alexander Inostrantsev, wich is Amalitsky's teacher himself. The descriptions were officially published posthumously in 1922, and the two skeletons were placed under the property of the Institute of Paleontology of the Russian Academy of Sciences.

In 1927, only five years after the publication of the discovery of I. alexandri, one of Amalitsky's colleagues, Pavel Pravoslavlev, announced the discovery of three new species: I. latifrons, I. parva and I. proclivis. Of all the named species, only I. latifrons was the only one recognized as a clearly distinct species within the genus, being based on skulls discovered within Arkhangelsk Oblast as well as a very incomplete skeleton from from the village of Zavrazhye, located in Vladimir Oblast. The specific epithet latifrons comes from the Latin latus "broad" and frōns "forehead", in reference to the size and the more robust cranial constitution than that of I. alexandri. In his book, Pravoslavlev also changed the typography of the name "Inostranzevia" to "Inostrancevia". This last term has since entered into universal usage and must be maintained according to the rule of article 33.3.1 of the ICZN.

In 1974, Leonid Tatarinov described the third species, I. uralensis, based on rare remains of part of the skull from an individual smaller than the other two recognized species. The specific epithet uralensis refers to the Ural River, located in Orenburg Oblast, where the holotype specimen of the taxon was found.

Other species 

Due to the poor quality of preservation of some Inostrancevia fossils, several specimens were therefore incorrectly found to belong to separate taxa. Only three species are recognized today, I. alexandri, I. latifrons and I. uralensis.

In his 1927 monograph, Pravoslavlev names two additional species of the genus Inostrancevia: I. parva and I. proclivis. In 1940, the paleontologist Ivan Yefremov expressed doubts about this classification, and considered that the holotype specimen of I. parva should be view as a juvenile of the genus and not as a distinct species. It was in 1953 that Boris Pavlovich Vyuschkov completely revised the species named for Inostrancevia. For I. parva, he moves it to a new genus, which he names Pravoslavlevia, in honor of the original author who named the species. Although being a distinct and valid genus, Pravoslavlevia turns out to be a closely related taxon. Also in his article, he considers that I. proclivis is a junior synonym of I. alexandri, but remains open to the question of the existence of this species, arguing his opinion with the insufficient preservation of type specimens. This taxon will be definitively judged as being conspecific to I. alexandri in the revision of the genus carried out by Tatarinov in 1974.

Also in is work, Pravoslavlev names another genus of gorgonopsians, Amalitzkia, with the two species it includes: A. vladimiri and A. annae, both named in reference to the pair of paleontologists who carried out the work on the first specimens known of I. alexandri. In 1953, Vjuschkov discovered that the genus Amalitzkia is a junior synonym of Inostrancevia, renaming A. vladimiri to I. vladimiri, before the latter was itself recognized as a junior synonym of I. latifrons by later publications. For some unclear reason, Vjuschkov refers A. annae as a nomen nudum, when his description is quite viable. Just like A. vladimiri, A. annae will be synonymized with I. latifrons by Tatarinov in 1974.

Other species belonging to distinct lineages were sometimes inadvertently classified in the genus Inostrancevia. For example, in 1940, Efremov classifies a gorgonopsian of then-problematic status as I. progressus. However, in 1955, Alexey Bystrow moved this species to the separate genus Sauroctonus. A large maxilla discovered in Vladimir Oblast in the 1950s was also assigned to Inostrancevia, but the fossil would be reassigned to a large therocephalian in 1997, and later designated as the holotype of the genus Megawhaitsia.

Description

Size 

The specimens PIN 2005/1578 and PIN 1758, belonging to I. alexandri, are among the largest and most complete gorgonopsian fossils identified to date. The size of I. uralensis is unknown due to very incomplete fossils, but it appears to be smaller than I. latifrons.

General anatomy 

The majority of descriptions made of the genus as a whole concern I. alexandri, the other species being known only from very fragmentary remains.

The overall shape of the skull of Inostrancevia is similar to those of other gorgonopsians, although it has many differences allowing it to be distinguished from African representatives. It has a broad back skull, a raised and elongated snout, relatively small eye sockets and thin cranial arches. The pineal foramen is located near the posterior edge of the parietals and rests on a strong projection in the middle of an elongated hollow like impression. The three recognized species have notable characteristics between them. I. alexandri is distinguished by its relatively narrow occiput, a broad and rounded oval temporal fenestra and the transverse flangues of the pterygoid with teeth. I. latifrons is distinguished by a comparatively lower and broader snout, larger parietal region, fewer teeth and a less developed palatal tuberosities. I. uralensis is characterized by a transversely elongated oval slot-like temporal fenestra.

The jaws of I. alexandri are powerfully developed, equipped with teeth able to hold and tear the skin of prey. The teeth are also devoid of cusps and can be distinguished into three types: the incisors, the canines and the postcanines. All teeth are more or less laterally compressed and have finely serrated front and rear edges. When the mouth is closed, the upper canines move into position at the sides of the mandible, reaching its lower edge. The incisors turn out to be very robust. The postcanine teeth are present on the upper jaw, on its slightly upturned alveolar edges. In contrast, they are completely absent from the lower jaw. There are indications that the tooth replacement would have taken place by the young teeth, growing at the root of the old ones and gradually supplanting them.

The skeleton is of very robust constitution. The ungual phalanges have an acute triangular shape.

Classification
In the original description published in 1922, Inostrancevia was initially classified as a gorgonopsian close to the African genus Gorgonops. Subsequently, few gorgonopsians will be listed in Russia, but the identification of Pravoslavlevia will mark a new turning point in its classification. In 1974, Tatarinov classified the two genera in the family Inostranceviidae. In 1989, Denise Sigogneau-Russell proposes a similar classification, but moves the taxon reuniting the two genera as a subfamily, being renamed Inostranceviinae, and is classified in the more general family Gorgonopsidae. In 2003, Mikhail Ivakhnenko reclassifies Inostrancevia in the family Inostranceviidae, similar to Tatarinov's proposal, but the latter classifies it alone, making it a monotypic taxon. In 2007, Eva V. I. Gebauer moved Inostrancevia as a sister taxon to the Rubidgeinae, a lineage consisting of robust African gorgonopsians. In 2016 Christian F. Kammerer regarded Gebauer's analysis as "unsatisfactory", citing that many of the characters used by her analysis were based upon skull proportions that are variable within taxa, both individually and ontogenetically (i.e. traits that change through growth).

In 2018, in their official description of Nochnitsa, Kammerer and Vladimir Masyutin propose that all Russian and African taxa should be separately grouped into two distinct clades. For Russian genera (except basal taxa), this relationship is supported by notable cranial traits, such as the close contact between pterygoid and vomer. The discovery of other Russian gorgonopsians and the relationship between them and Inostrancevia has never before been recognized, for the simple reason that some authors undoubtedly compared them to African genera. The classification proposed by Kammerer and Masyutin will serve as the basis for all other subsequent phylogenetic studies of gorgonopsians. As with previous classifications, Pravoslavlevia is still considered as the sister taxon of Inostrancevia.

The following cladogram showing the position of Inostrancevia within Gorgonopsia follows Kammerer and Rubidge (2022):

Paleobiology

Hunting strategy

One of the most recognizable characteristics of Inostrancevia, and other gorgonopsians as well, is the presence of long, saber-like canines on the upper and lower jaws. How these animals would have used this dentition is debated, the bite force of saber-toothed predators like Inostrancevia, using three-dimensional analysis, was determined by Stephan Lautenschlager and colleagues in 2020 to uncover answers. Their findings detail that despite morphological convergence among saber-toothed predators, there is a diversity in possible killing techniques. The similarly sized gorgonopsian Rubidgea is capable of producing a bite force of 715 newtons. Although lacking the necessary jaw strength of being capable of crushing bone, the analysis details that the most massive gorgonopsians possess a more powerful bite than other saber-toothed predators. The study also indicated that the jaw of Inostrancevia was capable of a massive gape, perhaps enabling this latter to deliver a lethal bite similar to the hypothesised killing technique of Smilodon, another sabre-toothed predator.

Paleoenvironment 

During the Late Permian when Inostrancevia lived, the Southern Urals (close in proximity to the Sokolki assemblage) were located around latitude 28–34°N and defined as a “cold desert” dominated by fluvial deposits. The Salarevo Formation in particular (a horizon where Inostrancevia hails from) was deposited in a seasonal, semi-arid to arid area with multiple shallow water lakes which was periodically flooded. The Paleoflora of much of European Russia at the time was dominated by a genus of peltaspermaceaen, Tatarina, and other related genera, followed by ginkgophytes and conifers. On the other hand, ferns were relatively rare and sphenophytes were only locally present. There are also hygrophyte and halophyte plants in coastal areas as well as conifers that are more resistant to drought and higher altitudes.

Inostrancevia was the top predator of its environment, existing alongside a number of notable species including the pareiasaur Scutosaurus and the dicynodont Vivaxosaurus which were likely prey items. Other, smaller predators existed alongside Inostrancevia such as the smaller related gorgonopsid Pravoslavlevia and the therocephalian Annatherapsidus.

See also 

 Sauroctonus
 Suchogorgon
 Pravoslavlevia

Notes

References

External links

 

Gorgonopsia
Apex predators
Prehistoric therapsid genera
Lopingian synapsids of Europe
Wuchiapingian genera
Permian Russia
Fossils of Russia
Fossil taxa described in 1922
Taxa named by Vladimir Prokhorovich Amalitskii